The Colour of My Love is the third English-language and twelfth studio album by Canadian singer Celine Dion. It was released by Columbia Records/550 Music on 9 November 1993. The songs were produced mainly by David Foster, Ric Wake, Guy Roche, Walter Afanasieff and Christopher Neil, and four of them were written by Diane Warren. The album features cover versions of "The Power of Love" and "When I Fall in Love".

After its release, The Colour of My Love received generally mixed reviews from music critics but became a huge commercial success, topping the charts in Canada, Australia, the United Kingdom and a few other European countries, and reaching the top ten elsewhere, including number four in the United States. The Colour of My Love remains one of the best-selling albums of all time selling over 20 million copies worldwide, including six million units in the United States, over 1.8 million copies in the United Kingdom, 1.5 million in Canada and over one million units in Japan. Singles released from the album include the US number one "The Power of Love", the UK number one "Think Twice", and the Japanese chart topper "To Love You More", which was included on the 1995 re-release of The Colour of My Love in Japan. Each of these singles sold over one million copies in these countries.

The Colour of My Love won two Juno Awards for Album of the Year and Best Selling Album (Foreign or Domestic), and also received the IRMA Award for Best International Female Artist Album. "Think Twice" won the Ivor Novello Award for Best Song Musically and Lyrically and "To Love You More" received the International Single Grand Prix at the Japan Gold Disc Award. "When I Fall in Love" won the Grammy Award for Best Instrumental Arrangement Accompanying Vocal(s) and was nominated for the Grammy Award for Best Pop Performance by a Duo or Group with Vocals in 1994. "The Power of Love" was also nominated for the Grammy Award for Best Female Pop Vocal Performance in 1995.

Background and release
After releasing two English-language studio albums, Unison (1990) and Celine Dion (1992), recording Academy Award and Grammy Award-winning song, "Beauty and the Beast", and achieving three top ten entries on the Billboard Hot 100 ("Where Does My Heart Beat Now", "Beauty and the Beast" and "If You Asked Me To"), Dion started working on her third English-language album, entitled The Colour of My Love. In September 1993, she performed two concerts at the Capitole de Québec in Quebec City, Canada, which were recorded to be later broadcast on television. Dion performed brand new, unheard songs from the upcoming album The Colour of My Love, including: "Refuse to Dance", "Everybody's Talkin' My Baby Down", "The Colour of My Love", "The Power of Love", "Misled", "Think Twice" and "Only One Road". The show entitled later The Colour of My Love Concert was issued as a home video in 1995. The Colour of My Love was released in November 1993 in North America, December 1993 in Japan, February 1994 in Europe and in March 1994 in Australia.

In the album's liner notes, Dion for the first time publicly revealed her relationship with her manager, René Angélil. During the album's launch event at Montreal's Metropolis, she announced they are engaged to be married.

Content
The Colour of My Love was released with fourteen songs in the United States and fifteen tracks, including "Just Walk Away", elsewhere. The album was produced mainly by David Foster, Ric Wake, Guy Roche, Walter Afanasieff and Christopher Neil. Diane Warren wrote four songs for The Colour of My Love, including: "Next Plane Out", "Real Emotion", "No Living Without Loving You" and "Lovin' Proof". The album features duet with Clive Griffin on "When I Fall in Love", taken from the Sleepless in Seattle soundtrack and a cover version of Jennifer Rush's 1985 track, "The Power of Love". In October 1995, The Colour of My Love was re-released in Japan, including new song, "To Love You More", written and produced by David Foster.

Singles
After "When I Fall in Love", which originally appeared on the Sleepless in Seattle soundtrack, "The Power of Love" was issued as the first proper single from The Colour of My Love. The song was very successful, reaching number one in the United States, Canada and Australia, and peaking inside top ten in various countries, including the United Kingdom and France. "The Power of Love" has sold over 1.1 million copies in the United States and was certified Platinum in 1994. The next song, "Misled", became a top ten single in Canada and also reached number one on the Hot Dance Club Songs in the United States. Another success came with the release of "Think Twice", a single which topped the charts in the United Kingdom, Ireland, Belgium, Denmark, Norway, Sweden and the Netherlands, and reached top ten in Australia, Spain and Switzerland. "Think Twice" has sold over 1.3 million copies in the United Kingdom and was certified Platinum in 1995 (eligible for two-times Platinum). The next single, "Only One Road" peaked inside top ten in the United Kingdom, Spain and Ireland. In 1995, "Next Plane Out" was released in Australia and "Just Walk Away" was issued as a promotional single in Spain. In October 1995, The Colour of My Love was re-released in Japan, including new song, "To Love You More", which was released as a single at the same time. "To Love You More" reached number one on the Oricon Singles Chart and has sold 1.5 million copies in Japan. It was certified Million by the RIAJ.

Promotion
Dion promoted The Colour of My Love in North America on various television programmes in late 1993 and early 1994. Additionally, her The Colour of My Love Concert aired in December 1993 in Canada and in February 1994 in the United States. Dion also embarked on The Colour of My Love Tour and performed concerts in the United States in February 1994, and in Canada through May 1994. After the success of "Think Twice" outside North America, she also started promoting the album in 1995 in Europe, including the United Kingdom. One of the most important performances, after releasing the album include: "The Power of Love" at the Juno Awards of 1994 and American Music Awards of 1995, "Think Twice" at the Edison Awards in 1994 and World Music Awards in 1995, and "The Colour of My Love" at the Juno Awards of 1995. Dion also performed three songs form The Colour of My Love on Top of the Pops in the United Kingdom: "The Power of Love" (1994), "Think Twice" (1995) and "Only One Road" (1995).

Critical reception

Upon release, the album received mixed reviews from music critics, with positive attention given to Dion's vocals. Stephen Thomas Erlewine from AllMusic gave it three out of five stars and wrote that the album follows the same pattern as Dion's eponymous breakthrough, and while the songs are not quite as consistent this time around, the record is nevertheless quite successful, thanks to the careful production, professional songwriting (highlighted by "When I Fall in Love", "The Power of Love", and "Think Twice") and Dion's powerhouse performances. Brad Webber from Chicago Tribune gave the album two out of four stars. He felt that "sickly sweet, by-the-books standards" like "The Power of Love" belie Dion's talent: "forcefully resonant and multiflavored vocals". He criticized "crooked roots" of a Janet Jackson impersonation ("Misled" and "Think Twice"), formulaic duo ballad ("When I Fall in Love") and added that with Dion's attempt at soul, you can categorize her as "fairly shallow, sort of a female Michael Bolton". However Webber praised an "exotic thrill" in "Refuse to Dance", which "throws a little variety in the mix". According to Billboard, The Colour of My Love is a "big-league affair" that should push Dion to "new realms of pop stardom". Dion is more mature and shows off her vocal prowess on probable smashes as "The Power of Love", "Misled" and "Only One Road". According to Larry Flick from Billboard, although The Colour of My Love is full of the "grand pop balladry", it also has more rhythmic depth than Dion's previous projects, including jack-swinging "Misled" and the "haunting but spine-crawling" "Refuse to Dance".

Commercial performance
The Colour of My Love remains one of the world's best-selling albums of all time. It was the second top-selling album of 1994 in Canada, third top-selling album of 1994 by a female artist in the United States, third top-selling album of 1995 in the UK and has sold more than 20 million copies worldwide.

Canada
In Canada, The Colour of My Love entered the RPM Albums Chart at number five and moved to the top in the fifth week. It stayed at number one for twelve consecutive weeks and spent eighty weeks on the chart in total. In December 1994, the album was certified Diamond by the CRIA for selling one million copies. It became the second best-selling album of the year 1994 in Canada, after Ace of Base's The Sign. By the end of 1995, Billboard reported that the album has already sold 10 million copies worldwide (including 1.4 million Canada). In November 1996, Billboard wrote that the sales of The Colour of My Love have reached 1.5 million units in Canada. The album also topped the Quebec chart for twenty weeks.

United States
In the United States, The Colour of My Love debuted at number eighty-eight, selling 16,000 copies. In March 1994, it peaked at number four on the Billboard 200 and spent 149 weeks on the chart. It became the 20th best selling record of 1994 in the United States (third by a female artist), selling 2.1 million copies in 1994 alone. The album has sold 4.6 million copies according to Nielsen SoundScan and was certified six-times Platinum by the RIAA in November 1999 for shipping six million copies in the United States.

Europe
In the United Kingdom, it debuted at number ten in March 1994. Thanks to the success of "Think Twice", the album reached number one on the UK Albums Chart in January 1995 and spent seven weeks at the top. For five consecutive weeks, "Think Twice" and The Colour of My Love  stood simultaneously on top of the UK charts, an achievement not replicated since 1965 and the heyday of The Beatles. In December 1995, the album was certified five-times Platinum by the BPI for selling 1.5 million copies. It also became the third best-selling album of 1995 in the United Kingdom, after Robson & Jeromes eponymous album and Oasis's (What's the Story) Morning Glory?. In November 2006, the Official Charts Company released a list of the 100 best-selling albums of all time in the United Kingdom. Dion made the list with three albums, including The Colour of My Love  at number seventy-seven with sales of 1,816,915 units (eligible for six-times Platinum certification). The Colour of My Love was also very successful in other European countries. It went to number one in Ireland, Norway, Belgium Flanders and Denmark, and reached top ten in France, Spain, Switzerland, Sweden, Finland, Portugal and the Netherlands. The album was certified Multi-Platinum, Platinum and Gold in various European countries. In 1996, IFPI certified it four-times Platinum for selling four million copies in Europe.

Japan
In Japan, the album originally peaked at number sixty-five in February 1994. It was certified Gold and has sold 200,000 units. Due to the success of "To Love You More" The Colour of My Love was re-issued with this song in October 1995 and reached number seven on the Oricon Albums Chart in November 1995. This re-release has sold 650,000 copies in 1995. While charting on the Oricon Albums Chart in 1995 and 1996, the re-issue of The Colour of My Love has sold 813,450 units. In January 1996, it was certified three-times Platinum by RIAJ and later that year, The Colour of My Love became Dion's first million-selling album in Japan, with the summed numbers of the original version and the re-release. As of May 1996, the album has sold over 1.5 million copies in the South East Asia.

Australia
In Australia, the album debuted at number nine in March 1994. Again, thanks to the success of "Think Twice", it topped the ARIA Chart in mid-1995 for eight weeks, achieving the longest run at number one for that year. It also became the second best-selling album of 1995 in Australia, after Tina Arena's Don't Ask. The Colour of My Love was certified nine-times Platinum by the ARIA for shipments of 630,000 copies. The Colour of My Love became one of the best-selling albums by Dion, with sales of twenty million copies worldwide.

Industry awards

The Colour of My Love won two Juno Awards of 1995 for Album of the Year and Best Selling Album (Foreign or Domestic). It also won the IRMA Award for Best International Female Artist Album in 1996 and was nominated for the Edison Award in 1995 in category Best Album. Songs from The Colour of My Love also received various nominations and awards around the world. "Think Twice" won the Ivor Novello Award for Best Song Musically and Lyrically, and "To Love You More" won the Japan Gold Disc Award in category International Single Grand Prix. "When I Fall in Love" won the Grammy Award for Best Instrumental Arrangement Accompanying Vocal(s) and was nominated for the Grammy Award for Best Pop Performance by a Duo or Group with Vocals. It also won two ASCAP Pop Awards in category Most Performed Songs and was nominated for the MTV Movie Award as Best Song from a Movie.

"The Power of Love" was nominated for the Grammy Award for Best Female Pop Vocal Performance, American Music Award for Favorite Pop/Rock Single, Juno Award for Single of the Year, and two Billboard Music Awards in category Hot 100 Single of the Year and Adult Contemporary Single of the Year. "The Power of Love" also won the ASCAP Pop Award as one of the Most Performed Songs and "Misled" won the BMI Pop Award in the same named category. Thanks to The Colour of My Love and its singles, Dion also won World Music Awards for Best Selling Canadian Female Artist of the Year and Best Selling Canadian Artist of the Year, Juno Award for Female Vocalist of the Year, and Félix Awards for Artist of the Year Achieving the Most Success Outside Quebec and Artist of the Year Achieving the Most Success in a Language Other Than French. Dion was also nominated for her first Brit Award in category Best International Female, and received nominations for other Billboard Music Awards and Juno Awards. The Colour of My Love Concert was also nominated for the Gemini Awards in 1995.

Track listingNotes'
 signifies an additional producer

Personnel
Adapted from AllMusic.

 Walter Afanasieff – acoustic guitar, keyboards, synthesizers, arranger, programming, drum programming, producer
 Mary Susan Applegate – composer
 John Birchall – hair stylist
 Jimmy Bralower – keyboards, drums, composer
 Tony Colton – composer
 Candy de Rouge – composer
 Russ DeSalvo – keyboards, composer
 Celine Dion – primary artist, vocals
 Phillip Dixon – photography
 John Doelp – executive producer
 Nancy Donald – art direction, design
 Charlie Dore – composer
 Felipe Elgueta – engineer
 Lenny Castro – percussion
 Mike Fisher – percussion
 David Foster – keyboards, synthesizers, composer, piano, arranger, drum programming, minimoog bass, producer
 Simon Franglen – synclavier
 Steve Lindsey – producer
 Jeremy Lubbock – arrangements, orchestras, conductor
 Phil Galdston – composer
 Arthur Ganov – composer
 Scott Harper – strings arrangements, composer
 Tsuneyoshi Saito – piano, synthesizer
 Yoshinobu Takeshita – bass, computer programming
 Taro Hakase – violin
 Humberto Gatica - engineer, mixing, producer
 Edward Heyman – composer
 Andy Hill – composer
 Jean McClain – backing vocals
 Vlado Meller – mastering engineer, mastering
 Pauline Wilson – backing vocals
 Larry Jacobs – backing vocals
 Maria Christensen – backing vocals
 David Barratt – coordinator
 Terry Taylor – backing vocals
 Tom Yezzi – engineer
 David Scheuer – assistant engineer
 Jackie Rowe – backing vocals
 Dan Hetzel – engineer
 Mario Luccy – assistant engineer, engineer, arranger
 Pam Sayne – backing vocals
 Bob Cadway – engineer
 Fred Kelly – assistant engineer
 Lajuan Carter – backing vocals
 David Reitzas – engineer
 Bill Leonard – assistant engineer
 Eddie Stockley – backing vocals
 Frank Wolf – engineer
 Eric Baron – assistant engineer
 Earl Robinson – backing vocals
 Erik Zobler– engineer
 David Shackney – assistant engineer
 Kennie Bobien – backing vocals
 Ken Allardyce – engineer
 David Eike – assistant engineer
 Eddie Stockley – backing vocals
 Ren Klyce – engineer
 Marnie Riley – assistant engineer
 Kennie Bobien – backing vocals
 Dana Jon Chappelle – engineer, mixing engineer
 Eric Flickinger – assistant engineer
 Earl Robinson – backing vocals
 Craig Silver – engineer
 Rick Kerr – mixing engineer
 Claytoven Richardson – backing vocals
 Kent Matcke – engineer
 Keith Cohen – mixing engineer
 Skyler Jett – performer, background vocals
 Jen Monnar – engineer
 Steve Peck – mixing engineer
 Clive Griffin – guest artist, performer, primary artist, vocals
 Kitty Beethoven – backing vocals
 Paul Mortimer – engineer
 Brian Malouf – mixing engineer
 Jeanie Tracy – backing vocals
 Simon Pressey – engineer
 Simon Hurrell – engineer, assistant engineer
 Ken Kessie – mixing
 Gary Cirimelli – backing vocals
 Felipe Elgueta – engineering, programming
 Junior Miles – lyrics
 Sandy Griffin – backing vocals
 Ross Hogarth – mixing
 Pauline Leonard – stylist
 Vito Luprano – executive producer
 Barry Mann – composer
 Vladimir Meller – mastering
 Gunther Mende – composer
 L. Leon Pendarvis – arranger
 Christopher Neil – producer
 Andre Proulx – violin
 Aldo Nova – keyboards, synthesizers, guitar, drum programming, minimoog bass, producer
 Michael Thompson – guitars
 Tim Renwick – guitars
 Peter Zizzo – guitar, backing vocals
 Bob Mann – guitar
 Dean Parks – guitar
 Bob Cadway – guitar
 John Pierce – bass
 Guy Roche – drums, producer, engineer
 Jimmy Greco – drums
 Arnie Roman – composer
 Jennifer Rush – composer
 Danny Schogger – composer
 Carol Shaw – make-up
 Peter Sinfield – composer
 Ric Wake – arranger, producer
 Jeff Jones – executive producers
 Steve Berkowitz – executive producers
 Stephen Walker – art direction, design
 Diane Warren – composer
 Cynthia Weil – composer
 Richard Wold – composer
 Victor Young – composer
 Peter Zizzo – composer

Charts

Weekly charts

Year-end charts

All-time charts

Certifications and sales

Release history

See also

Juno Award for Album of the Year
Juno Award for International Album of the Year
List of best-selling albums
List of best-selling albums by women
List of Canadian number-one albums of 1993
List of Canadian number-one albums of 1994
List of diamond-certified albums in Canada
List of number-one albums in Australia during the 1990s
List of Top 25 albums for 1995 in Australia
List of Top 25 albums for 1996 in Australia
List of UK Albums Chart number ones of the 1990s

References

External links
 

1993 albums
550 Music albums
Albums produced by Aldo Nova
Albums produced by Christopher Neil
Albums produced by David Foster
Albums produced by Guy Roche
Albums produced by Ric Wake
Albums produced by Walter Afanasieff
Celine Dion albums
Epic Records albums
Juno Award for Album of the Year albums
Juno Award for International Album of the Year albums